Amblyptilia atrodactyla is a moth of the family Pterophoridae. It is found on the Bismarck Archipelago off the northeastern coast of New Guinea.

References

Moths described in 1900
Amblyptilia
Moths of New Guinea